The World Aircraft Surveyor is a production all metal, two place, tricycle gear, high wing, open cockpit, pusher configuration light-sport aircraft.

Specifications (Surveyor)

References

External links

Single-engined pusher aircraft